Modicus tangaroa  is a clingfish of the family  Gobiesocidae, found only around New Zealand where it occurs on coarse substrates consisting of shell fragments and bryozoa at depths of . This species was described by Grahma S Hardy in 1983 from types collected from the research vessel Tangoroa over the Ranfurly Bank, East Cape in New Zealand, the species was named after the vessel.

References

tangaroa
Endemic marine fish of New Zealand
Fish described in 1983